Benign proliferative breast disease is a group of noncancerous conditions that may increase the risk of developing breast cancer. Examples include atypical ductal hyperplasia, atypical lobular hyperplasia, and intraductal papillomas.

References

External links 
 Benign proliferative breast disease entry in the public domain NCI Dictionary of Cancer Terms

Breast neoplasia